Eleoniscus is a genus of the small terrestrial crustaceans known as woodlice. It includes one species, Eleoniscus helenae, which is endemic to Alicante province, Spain, where it is known from two caves. It may have been extirpated from one of the two caves (the species' type location) through the increasing urbanisation of the Macizo de Montgó.

References

Woodlice
Woodlice of Europe
Fauna of the Iberian Peninsula
Monotypic arthropod genera
Endemic fauna of Spain